Nikitas Platis (1912 – November 14, 1984) was a Greek actor in theater and movies.  He was the husband of an actress Golfo Bini.  He took part in a television series Methoriakos stathmos in which he done an unforgettable emphasis as a leader of opposition of a community which was founded in a difficult point with the communal leader.  He died on November 14, 1981 and is buried at Kokkinos Mylos cemetery. He raised a son Sotirios in which he later died.

Filmography

As cinematographer

References

External links

1912 births
1984 deaths
Greek male actors
People from Amorgos
20th-century Greek male actors